Saint Madeleine and Saint Catherine, also known as Saint Catherine and Saint Madeleine, is a circa 1440 religious painting by the German Gothic artist Konrad Witz. The painting was legated to the city of Strasbourg by the canon Alexandre Joseph Straub, and entered the collections in 1893. It is on display in the Musée de l'Œuvre Notre-Dame. Its inventory number is MBA 97 ("MBA" stands for Musée des Beaux-Arts).

The painting represents both saints with their attributes (Madeleine's vessel of ointment, and Catherine's wheel and book, here a girdle book). In spite of the sumptuosity of their costumes and jewels, and the preciosity of their golden halos, Witz depicts them with the realistic faces of young peasant women and in a stiff attitude that reminds of play acting. Both saints are sitting in a cloister that is thought to have belonged to Basel Cathedral, and Witz opens his tentative perspective towards a street scene, again depicted with noticeable realism.

The painting may have belonged to an unfinished altarpiece (probably a triptych) but it could also have been autonomous from the start. While the drapery displays the influence of contemporary Netherlandish painting, the spatial perspective appears to be Witz's own, pioneering experiment.

References

External links

Sainte Madeleine et sainte Catherine , presentation on the museum's website
Jean Wirth: Remarques sur le tableau de Konrad Witz conservé à Strasbourg, Journal of Swiss archeology and art history issue 44 (1987).

Paintings by Konrad Witz
Beaux-Arts
1440s paintings
Paintings of Catherine of Alexandria
Paintings depicting Mary Magdalene
Gothic paintings
Books in art
Paintings in the collection of the Musée des Beaux-Arts de Strasbourg